Cytochrome c oxidase assembly factor 7 (putative) (COA7), also known as Beta-lactamase hap-like protein, Respiratory chain assembly factor 1 (RESA1), Sel1 repeat-containing protein 1 (SELRC1), or C1orf163 is a protein that in humans is encoded by the COA7 gene. The protein encoded by COA7 is an assembly factor important for the mitochondrial respiratory chain. Mutations in COA7 have been associated with cytochrome c oxidase deficiency resulting in spinocerebellar ataxia with axonal neuropathy type 3 and mitochondrial myopathy.

Structure 
COA7 is located on the p arm of chromosome 1 in position 32.3 and has 3 exons. The COA7 gene produces a 25.7 kDa protein composed of 231 amino acids. COA7, the protein encoded by this gene, is a member of the hcp beta-lactamase family. This protein has a series of 5 Sel1-like tetratricopeptide repeat domains. It is also believed to be a soluble mitochondrial protein that contains large amounts of cysteine. Additionally, COA7 contains an N-acetylalanine amino acid modification at position 2.

Function 
COA7 is a protein assembly factor that is important for normal mitochondrial respiratory chain activity. It is believed to be involved in the assembly of cytochrome c oxidase (complex IV), but may also have effects on complex I and even complex III as well. It has been suggested that COA7 is a mitochondrial soluble intermembrane space protein, however, others have indicated that this soluble protein may actually be localized to the mitochondrial matrix.

Clinical significance 
Mutations in COA7 have been associated with spinocerebellar ataxia with axonal neuropathy type 3 and mitochondrial myopathy resulting from cytochrome c oxidase (complex IV) deficiency. Complex IV deficiency is a disorder of the mitochondrial respiratory chain with heterogeneous clinical manifestations, ranging from isolated myopathy to severe multisystem disease affecting several tissues and organs. In cases of pathogenic COA7 mutations, patient clinical manifestations can include sensory disturbance, decreased deep tendon reflexes, dysarthria, peripheral neuropathy, axonal sensorimotor neuropathy, ataxia, cerebellar and spinal cord atrophy, leukoencephalopathy, elevated serum creatine kinase levels, ragged-red fibers, and cognitive impairment. COA7 loss-of-function has been shown to lead to the disruption of oxidative phosphorylation, with cytochrome c oxidase activity being the most affected complex. Pathogenic variations have been known to include D6G, S149I, G144fs, and Y137C amino acid changes in addition to a c.115C>T exon 2 deletion.

Interactions 
COA7 has been shown to have 27 binary protein-protein interactions including 16 co-complex interactions. COA7 appears to interact with EFHC1, SNRPB, SUOX, AES, ENKD1, and GPSM3.

References 

Human proteins
Genes on human chromosome 1